Prague Congress Centre (Czech: Kongresové centrum Praha, shortly KCP) originally Palace of culture Prague (Czech: Palác kultury) is a large neofunctionalist building in Czech Republic capital Prague 4 district Nusle, located on the edge of Nusle Valley (Czech: Nuselské údolí), near to the Nusle Bridge and Prague Metro C station Vyšehrad. There are 70 halls, lounges and meeting rooms of various sizes in this building, with total capacity of 9,300 people.

Biggest of them; Congress hall (Czech: Kongresový sál) has maximum capacity of 2,764 people. Mainly congresses, musicals, meetings, festivals, and concerts are normally held in this building.

History 
Construction of Prague Congress Centre started in 1976, it was opened in 1981 as Palace of culture Prague. Opening event was attended by Czechoslovak president Gustav Husák. In 1995, it was renamed to current name Prague Congress Centre. Between 1998 and 2000 refurbishment and completion of this building was completed.

Notable events 
 2000 – 55th International Monetary Fund and World Bank meeting
 2002 – NATO summit
 2015 – EUROMAR meeting
 2017 - Rocky (musical)
 2018 – FEBS congress

References

External links 

 Official website

Music venues completed in 1981
Theatres completed in 1981
Theatres in Prague
Convention centers in the Czech Republic
Prague 4
1981 establishments in Czechoslovakia
20th-century architecture in the Czech Republic